Arnulf Zitelmann (born 9 March 1929 in Oberhausen-Sterkrade) is a German writer. He taught religion and is now a freelance author in Ober-Ramstadt. He has published numerous adventure novels and biographies with Beltz & Gelberg. He received the Friedrich-Bödecker-Prize and the Grand Prize of the German Academy for Children's and Youth Literature for his work as a whole. In 1978, he wrote and published a children's book called Small Trail, which is illustrated by Willi Glasauer, and published by Beltz & Gelberg.

External links
 

1929 births
Living people
Sterkrade
German male writers